The list of ship launches in 1795 includes a chronological list of some ships launched in 1795.


References

1795
Ship launches